Sagowr-e Farrih Mohammad (also Romanized as Sagowr-e Farrīḩ Moḩammad; also known as Sagowr-e Farayeḩ and Şagowr-e Farrīḩ) is a village in Allah-o Akbar Rural District, in the Central District of Dasht-e Azadegan County, Khuzestan Province, Iran. At the 2006 census, its population was 283, in 39 families.

References 

Populated places in Dasht-e Azadegan County